The succession to the Omani throne constitutes those individuals eligible to succeed to the throne of the Sultanate of Oman.

Succession rules
The succession is governed by the Basic Statute of Oman, and is restricted to male descendants of Sultan Turki bin Said, who must be Muslim, "rational" and the legitimate son of Omani Muslim parents. Until January 2021, the succession was by selection among the eligible male descendants of Turki bin Said. 

On 11 January 2021, Sultan Haitham amended the Basic Statute to institute a formal line of succession, repealing Royal Decree 96/101 promulgated by his predecessor Sultan Qaboos in November 1996, and created the title and position of Crown Prince of Oman. Under this amendment, succession to the throne is by male primogeniture amongst the eligible male descendants of Turki bin Said. While the royal decree of Qaboos governing the succession restricted it to eligible family members aged 21 and older, the 2021 amendment eliminated this requirement, and provides for a regency council in the event the new Sultan is not yet of age.

Line of succession
= Deceased or abdicated monarch
= Ruling monarch
 Sultan Turki bin Said of Muscat and Oman (1832–1888)
 Sultan Faisal bin Turki of Muscat and Oman (1864–1913)
 Sultan Taimur bin Faisal of Muscat and Oman (1886–1965)
 Sultan Said bin Taimur of Muscat and Oman (1910–1972)
 Sultan Qaboos bin Said of Oman (1940–2020)
 Sayyid Tariq bin Taimur (1921–1980)
 Sultan Haitham bin Tariq of Oman (born 1954)
(1) Sayyid Theyazin bin Haitham, Crown Prince of Oman (born 1990) 
 (2) Sayyid Belarab bin Haitham
(3) Sayyid Talal bin Tariq (born 1947)
 (4) Sayyid Nabigh bin Talal
Sayyid Asa'ad bin Tariq (born 1954)
Sayyid Shihab bin Tariq (born 1956)
Sayyid Adham bin Tariq (born 1959)
 Sayyid Faris bin Tariq (born 1961)

References

Al Said dynasty
Middle Eastern royal families
Arab dynasties
Omani monarchy
Oman-related lists